Neyasar Rural District is a rural district (dehestan) in Neyasar District, Kashan County, Isfahan Province, Iran. At the 2006 census, its population was 4,823, in 1,437 families.  The rural district has 20 villages.

References 

Rural Districts of Isfahan Province
Kashan County